The 2000 Bank of Ireland All-Ireland Senior Football Championship was the 114th edition of the GAA's premier Gaelic football competition. The championship began on 7 May 2000 and ended on 7 October 2000.

Meath entered the championship as the defending champions; however, they were beaten by Offaly in the Leinster quarter-final.

On 24 September 2000, the All-Ireland final between Kerry and Galway ended in a draw, 0-14 apiece. Kerry won the replay two weeks later by 0–17 to 1-10, thus claiming their 32nd All-Ireland title.

This was the final year that the provincial knockout format was used, before the qualifier system was introduced in 2001.

Format
The Ulster, Munster and Connacht championships were conducted as straight knock-out competitions. In the Leinster championship, seven teams received byes to the quarter-finals, while the other four — Wicklow, Wexford, Longford and Carlow — played a round-robin to determine the 8th team to play in the Leinster quarter-finals.  The winners of each provincial competition went on to play in the All Ireland semi-finals.

Provincial championships

Connacht Senior Football Championship

Quarter-finals

Semi-finals

Final

Munster Senior Football Championship

Quarter-finals

Semi-finals

Final

Ulster Senior Football Championship

Preliminary round

Quarter-finals

Semi-finals

Final

Leinster Senior Football Championship

Group stage

Quarter-finals

Semi-finals

Final

All-Ireland Senior Football Championship

Bracket

Semi-finals 

Finals

Championship statistics

Top scorers

Overall

Single game

Miscellaneous

 On 14 May 2000, Brewster Park, Enniskillen played host to its first championship game for 55 years between Fermanagh vs Monaghan.
 Antrim's Ulster quarter-final defeat of Down is their first championship victory in 18 years.
 Sligo record their first win over Mayo since 1975.
 The Leinster final ends in a draw and goes to a replay for the first time since 1950.
 The All-Ireland semi-final between Kerry and Armagh ends in a draw and goes to a replay for the first time since 1987 game between Cork & Galway.
 The All-Ireland final ends in a draw and goes to a replay for the first time since 1996.

References

External links
 Do you remember the last Ulster SFC final before the back door arrived?